The 4th ceremony of West Bengal Film Journalists' Association Award, Honoring best movies of the past year took place on Jan 14, 2020.

Nagarkirtan became the most awarded movie of the ceremony winning 8 awards including Best Film, Best Actor & Best Director

Winners & Nominations

Best Film 

◆ Other Best Film Winners

Best Director 

◆ Other Best Director Winners

Best Actor 

◆ Other Best Actor Winners

Best Actress 

◆ Other Best Actress Winner

Best Actor in a Supporting Role 

◆ Other Best Actor in a Supporting Role Winners

Best Actress in a Supporting Role 

◆ Other Best Actress in a Supporting Role Winners

Best Promising Director

Best Promising Actor

Best Promising Actress

Best Popular Film

Best Popular Actor

Best Actor in a Negative Role

Best Actor in a Comic Role

Best Screenplay

Best Cinematographer

Best Editor

Best Art Director

References 

West Bengal Film Journalists' Association Awards
2020 awards
Indian awards